Francis Turner may refer to:

Sportspeople
Francis Turner (cricketer, born 1890) (1890–1979), English cricketer
Francis Turner (cricketer, born 1894) (1894–1954), English first-class cricketer

Others
Francis A. Turner (1900–1962), American politician from Iowa
Francis Turner (engineer) (1908–1999), U.S. government worker credited with creation of the Interstate Highway System
Francis Turner (bishop) (1637–1700), Bishop of Ely
Francis John Turner (1904–1985), New Zealand geologist
Francis Turner (aviator) (1897–1982), World War I flying ace

See also
Frank Turner (disambiguation)